Argonne is an unincorporated census-designated place in the town of Argonne, Forest County, Wisconsin, United States. Argonne has a post office with ZIP code 54511. The community was established in 1888. As of the 2010 census, its population was 160.

References

Census-designated places in Forest County, Wisconsin
Census-designated places in Wisconsin
Populated places established in 1888